Argonaut Glacier is a tributary glacier about  long in the Mountaineer Range of Victoria Land, Antarctica. It flows east to enter Mariner Glacier just north of Engberg Bluff. It was named by the New Zealand Geological Survey Antarctic Expedition, 1962–63, in association with Aeronaut, Cosmonaut and Cosmonette Glaciers.

See also
 List of glaciers in the Antarctic
 Glaciology

References
 

Glaciers of Borchgrevink Coast